Dundy may refer to:

Dundy County, Nebraska
Elmer Scipio Dundy (1830–1896), American Judge and namesake of Dundy County, Nebraska
Elmer "Skip" Dundy (1862–1907), son of Elmer Scipio Dundy and showman
Elaine Dundy (1921–2008), American novelist, actress and playwright

See also 
 Dundee (disambiguation)